Bruce Douglas Bochy (born April 16, 1955), nicknamed "Boch" and "Headly", is an American professional baseball manager and former catcher who is the current manager of the Texas Rangers of Major League Baseball (MLB). He managed the San Diego Padres from 1995 to 2006, and the San Francisco Giants from 2007 to 2019. During his playing career, Bochy was a catcher for the Houston Astros, New York Mets, and San Diego Padres. Prior to becoming the Giants' manager, he was the Padres' manager for 12 seasons. Bochy led the Giants to three World Series championships, and previously led the Padres to one World Series appearance. Bochy is the 11th manager in MLB history to achieve 2,000 wins.

Bochy is the only former Padres player to serve as the team's manager on a non-interim basis. In 1998, he led the Padres to their first National League (NL) pennant in 14 years; however, they lost the 1998 World Series to the New York Yankees.

Bochy reached the World Series for a second time as the manager of the 2010 Giants, this time in a winning effort over the Texas Rangers, and brought the first ever World Series Championship home to the city of San Francisco; it was the first for the Giants franchise since 1954. Two years later, in the 2012 World Series, by sweeping the Detroit Tigers, Bochy managed the Giants to their second World Series Championship win in three years. He reached the World Series for a fourth time, in 2014, and managed his third World Championship in five years, this time leading the Giants over the Kansas City Royals in seven games.

Bochy was both the first foreign-born manager to reach the World Series (1998) and the first European-born manager to win the World Series. On July 23, 2013, he became the 21st manager with 1500 wins. On April 10, 2017, Bochy surpassed Dusty Baker for the most wins in the West Coast portion of Giants history. He is the only manager in Major League history to win at least 900 games with two different teams.

Early life
Bochy is one of just seven Major Leaguers to be born in France (in Bussac-Forêt, Charente-Maritime), where his father, Sgt. Major Gus Bochy, was stationed as a U.S. Army NCO at the time.  Growing up, Bochy moved with his family to the Panama Canal Zone, South Carolina, northern Virginia, and ultimately Melbourne, Florida.

Bochy graduated from Melbourne High School, where he was a baseball teammate of Darrell Hammond of Saturday Night Live fame.

College career
He attended Brevard Community College (later known as Eastern Florida State College) for two years on a partial scholarship, winning a state championship in 1975. before committing to play baseball for Eddie Stanky at South Alabama.

Professional career

Drafts and minor leagues
On January 9, 1975, Bochy was drafted by the Chicago White Sox in the 8th round of the 1975 MLB draft, but did not sign. On June 3, 1975, he was drafted in the first round (24th overall) by the Houston Astros in the 1975 Supplemental Draft and decided to turn professional.

Houston Astros (1978–1980)
With the Astros, Bochy primarily backed up Alan Ashby. With the Astros, he was behind the plate in Game 4 of the 1980 NLCS versus the Philadelphia Phillies when Pete Rose ran over Bochy to score the go-ahead run in the top of the tenth inning.

New York Mets (1982)
On February 11, 1981, Bochy was traded to the Mets for minor leaguers Stan Hough and Randy Rogers. On January 21, 1983, he was released by the Mets.

San Diego Padres (1983–1987)
On February 23, 1983, Bochy signed as a free agent with the San Diego Padres. With the Padres, he was the backup to Terry Kennedy from 1983–86 and rookie catcher Benito Santiago in 1987.

Bochy was the backup to Terry Kennedy when the Padres won their first NL pennant in 1984, and he played in one game in the 1984 World Series, which the Padres lost in five games to the Detroit Tigers.

On July 1, 1985, Bochy hit a tenth-inning walk-off home run off Nolan Ryan of the Houston Astros, the only walk-off home run allowed in Ryan's career. Bochy was behind the plate on September 11, 1985, when Pete Rose, with the Cincinnati Reds, collected his record-breaking 4,192nd major league hit off Padres pitcher Eric Show.

On November 9, 1987, Bochy was granted free agency.

In 1988, Bochy spent his final season playing in Triple-A Las Vegas where he served as a player-coach, batting .231 in 53 games.

In 802 career at-bats, he hit .239 with 26 home runs.

Managing career

Minor leagues
After retiring as a player, Bochy was hired by Padres general manager Jack McKeon to manage in their minor league system.  He started the 1989 season assisting the Class-A Riverside Red Wave before leaving to manage the Short-Season Class-A Spokane Indians, leading them to their third consecutive championship.  In 1990, Bochy took over as manager of the Red Wave, finishing with a 64–78 record.  In 1991, Bochy followed the team to Adelanto, California, where they became the High Desert Mavericks, and led them to a 73–63 record and California League title.  In 1992, Bochy was promoted to manager of the Double-A Wichita Wranglers, leading them to the Texas League title that year.

San Diego Padres (1995–2006)
After four years of managing for their minor league teams, the San Diego Padres picked Bochy to be the team's third-base coach under new manager Jim Riggleman in 1993.  Following the departure of Riggleman after the 1994 season, the Padres named Bochy as their new manager for the 1995 season. At age 39, Bochy became the youngest manager in the National League and helped the Padres improve from 47–70 in 1994 to 70–74 in his rookie year.

In 1996, his second season, Bochy led the Padres to a 91–71 record and their second National League West division title in franchise history, earning Bochy National League Manager of the Year and Sporting News National League Manager of the Year honors.  In 1998, Bochy led the Padres to a franchise-best 98–64 record and the second National League pennant in Padres history, earning Sporting News Manager of the Year honors for the second time. The Padres were swept in four games in the 1998 World Series by the New York Yankees.

After the World Series, the Padres dramatically cut payroll and suffered five straight losing seasons. In 2005 and 2006, Bochy led the Padres to consecutive NL West titles for the first time in franchise history, but they lost to the St. Louis Cardinals in the Division Series each year. Reliever Trevor Hoffman saved 457 games managed by Bochy, the most saves by one pitcher under one manager in Major League history, according to NBC Sports Bay Area. After the 2006 season, new Padres CEO Sandy Alderson preferred to have a younger manager, so he allowed Giants General Manager Brian Sabean to interview Bochy for his job opening.

Bochy left the Padres for the Giants after the 2006 season. He finished his Padres career with a regular season record of 951–975 and a post–season record of 8–16.  Bochy has the most games managed in Padres history and with that, the most wins and losses.  In 12 seasons under Bochy, the Padres had five winning seasons and won four NL West titles and one NL pennant. While with the Padres, Bochy also managed the 2004 and 2006 MLB All-Stars in the Major League Baseball Japan All-Star Series.

San Francisco Giants (2007–2019)

Bochy agreed to a three-year contract to replace Felipe Alou and become the Giants' new manager on October 27, 2006. On August 8, 2007, he won his 1,000th game as manager in a 5-0 victory over the Washington Nationals. After two seasons of 90+ losses in 2007 and 2008, the Giants rebounded to finish 88–74 in 2009, and remained in the playoff race into September behind a pitching staff with the second-lowest ERA in the Majors.  After the season, Bochy received a new two-year contract with an option for 2012.

In 2010, the Giants finished 92–70 and clinched their first NL West title since 2003 on the final day of the regular season against the Padres.  Bochy's "bunch of castoffs and misfits" defeated the Atlanta Braves in the 2010 NLDS and the reigning 2-time National League champion (who had  won a World Series during that stretch) Philadelphia Phillies in the NLCS.  The Giants defeated the Texas Rangers in five games in the 2010 World Series, bringing the first World Series championship to San Francisco and the Giants' first title since 1954 when the team was based in New York City.  Following the season, the Giants exercised Bochy's 2012 contract option. Bochy had managed in 2,574 games before earning his first World Series title, which established a record for most games managed to win a World Series that stood for 12 years.

In 2011, the Giants finished 86–76 and missed the playoffs.  After the season, the Giants extended Bochy's contract through 2013, with an option for 2014. In 2012, the Giants clinched the NL West for the second time in three years against the Padres, finishing with a 94–68 record.  In the postseason, the Giants fell behind the Cincinnati Reds 0–2 in the 2012 NLDS before winning three straight games to stave off elimination. In the NLCS, the Giants fell behind the St. Louis Cardinals three games to one, but again won three straight elimination games to clinch their second National League pennant in three seasons.  The Giants swept the 2012 World Series against the Detroit Tigers in four games.  After the season, Bochy said the tagline for 2012 was "never say die".

Before the 2013 season, the Giants extended Bochy's contract through 2016. Bochy became the 21st manager with 1,500 wins on July 23, 2013.  The Giants finished the season 76–86 and missed the playoffs in 2013.  When Jim Leyland retired after the 2013 season, Bochy became MLB's active leader in wins with 1,530.  In 2014, Bochy became the 19th manager to reach 1,600 wins on August 27, and also became the all-time NL Western Division leader in managerial wins, passing Los Angeles Dodgers manager Tommy Lasorda for that distinction, since the installment of division play in 1969.

With an 88–74 record, the Giants made the 2014 postseason as the second wild-card team.  During a low point of the regular season, Bochy told his players they had "champion blood", referring to the Giants' 2010 and 2012 championships.  After defeating the Pittsburgh Pirates in the NL Wild Card Game, the Giants beat the heavily favored Washington Nationals three games to one in the NLDS and the St. Louis Cardinals four games to one in the NLCS for their third NL pennant in five years.  Bochy's "group of warriors" went on to defeat the Kansas City Royals to win the 2014 World Series, a series that went the full seven games.  Bochy became the tenth manager in MLB history to win three championships, with the previous nine all inducted into the Hall of Fame.

On April 3, 2015, the Giants announced Bochy had signed a contract extension through the 2019 season.  On June 10, 2015, Bochy recorded his 700th win as Giants manager, making him the fourth in history to win at least 700 games for two different teams, joining Sparky Anderson, Tony La Russa, and Jim Leyland.  The milestone came on the same night that Chris Heston threw a no-hitter for the Giants, the fifth no-hitter by the Giants under Bochy (Jonathan Sánchez in 2009; Matt Cain's perfect game in 2012; and Tim Lincecum in 2013 and 2014).  On September 27, 2015, Bochy became the 16th manager to record 1,700 wins.  The Giants finished with an 84–78 record and missed the playoffs in 2015.

On June 26, 2016, Bochy recorded his 800th win as Giants manager.  On June 30, Bochy became the first manager since 1976 to intentionally forfeit the designated hitter, allowing Madison Bumgarner to bat for himself against the Oakland Athletics.  With an 87–75 record, the Giants made the 2016 postseason as the second wild-card team, clinching on the final day of the regular season.  The Giants defeated the New York Mets 3–0 in the NL Wild Card Game, their 11th straight postseason series win, dating back to 2010.  The Giants lost the 2016 NLDS in four games to the Chicago Cubs, their first postseason series loss under Bochy.

On April 9, 2017, at Petco Park, in a 5–3 win over the San Diego Padres, Bochy won his 840th game as Giants manager, tying Dusty Baker for the most wins in the West Coast portion of Giants history. The next day, in the Giants' home opener at AT&T Park and a 4–1 win over the Arizona Diamondbacks, Bochy surpassed Baker to become the all-time San Francisco Giants managerial wins leader.  On May 3, 2017, Bochy became the 15th manager to reach 1,800 wins. On September 25 at Chase Field, in a 9–2 win over the Arizona Diamondbacks, Bochy won his 900th career game as manager of the San Francisco Giants, making him the first manager in Major League history to win 900 games with two different teams.  Expected to be postseason contenders in 2017, the Giants instead fell to 64–98, matching Bochy's worst record as a manager, and the Giants' worst since 1985.

On July 29, 2018, Bochy recorded his 1,906th career victory as manager, surpassing Casey Stengel into 11th place on MLB's career wins list.  Numerous injuries and an underperforming offense resulted in the Giants finishing 73–89 in 2018.  With Mike Scioscia stepping down as the Los Angeles Angels manager on the last day of the 2018 MLB season, Bochy entered the 2019 season as the longest-tenured manager in Major League Baseball.

On February 18, 2019, Bochy announced he would retire following the conclusion of the 2019 season. On June 4 at Citi Field, in a 9-3 win over the New York Mets, Bochy won his 1,000th game as manager of the Giants. Bochy became the 25th manager to win 1,000 games with one team and he also joins John McGraw as the only two managers in Giants franchise history to reach the milestone and the first in San Francisco. On August 25, 2019, Bochy managed his 4,000th career game. He is only the eighth manager to manage 4,000 games. On September 18, 2019, Bochy won his 2,000th career game as a manager. He is the eleventh manager to win 2,000 games. The other ten managers are all in the Hall of Fame.

Bochy finished his Giants managerial career with a regular season record of 1052–1054 and a post–season record of 36–17.  In 13 seasons under Bochy, the Giants had seven winning seasons, four playoff appearances, and three NL pennants and World Series championships.  After retiring as manager, Bochy served in a front office role with the Giants.

On 9 December 2019, Bochy was named Manager of the France national baseball team.

Texas Rangers (2023–present)
On October 21, 2022, the Texas Rangers hired Bochy as their new manager and 29th in franchise history. He is also the first manager in the two-league era to have managed over 4,000 games in one league before managing a single game in the other, as this was his first managerial job in the American League. He is the second manager in the two-league era after Dusty Baker to have managed over 3,000 games in one league before managing a single game in the other.

Managerial record

Personal life
Bochy is the third of four children.  His older brother Joe was a one-time catcher in the Minnesota Twins system, and later worked as a professional scout for the Padres and Giants.

Bochy met his wife, Kim Seib, while at Brevard Community College in 1975 and they married in 1978.  They reside in Poway, California and have two sons, Greg and Brett.  Greg Bochy spent several seasons playing minor league baseball in the San Diego Padres system.  Bochy's younger son, Brett Bochy, was drafted by the Giants in 2010. Brett was called up to the majors on September 2, 2014, making Bruce the seventh manager in MLB history to manage his own son. On September 13, 2014, Bruce became the first manager to give the ball to his son coming out of the bullpen.

Bochy is known for having one of the largest cap sizes in Major League Baseball. With Houston, his nickname was "Headly," due to his unusually large head, with a hat size measurement of 8. When he joined the Mets in 1982, they did not have a helmet that would fit him, and they had to send for the ones he was using in the minors.

On February 19, 2015, Bochy underwent angioplasty to have two stents inserted in a blood vessel that was 90 percent blocked.  On August 8, 2016, Bochy was hospitalized overnight for an irregular heartbeat and underwent a cardioversion procedure, missing one game. On April 18, 2017, Bochy underwent a minor heart ablation to reduce discomfort, mostly due to an atrial flutter, and missed two games.  After the 2017 season, Bochy underwent another ablation procedure to treat an atrial fibrillation.

In May 2011, Bochy won the Ronald L. Jensen Award for Lifetime Achievement, which he accepted at Positive Coaching Alliance's National Youth Sports Awards.  In 2011, the baseball field at Brevard Community College was named Bruce Bochy Field in his honor.  In 2015, Bochy released A Book of Walks, describing his favorite walks around San Francisco and other major league cities.

Bochy has rated Johnny Bench as the first choice on "His Top Five Catchers, All-Time" list, with the following in descending order: Carlton Fisk, Yogi Berra, Thurman Munson, and Iván Rodríguez.

See also

 List of Major League Baseball managers by wins
 List of top 15 most ejected Major League Baseball managers
 List of second-generation Major League Baseball players

References
General
.
Notes

Inline citations

External links

Bruce Bochy at Astros Daily
Bruce Bochy at Ultimate Mets Database
Bruce Bochy at Pura Pelota (Venezuelan Professional Baseball League)

1955 births
Living people
Brevard College alumni
Cardenales de Lara players
American expatriate baseball players in Venezuela
Cocoa Astros players
Columbus Astros players
Dubuque Packers players
Eastern Florida State College people
Florida State University alumni
Houston Astros players
Brevard Tornados baseball players
Las Vegas Stars (baseball) players
Major League Baseball catchers
Major League Baseball players from France
Manager of the Year Award winners
Melbourne High School alumni
New York Mets players
Orlando Juice players
People from Melbourne, Florida
San Diego Padres managers
San Diego Padres players
San Francisco Giants managers
Spokane Indians managers
Tiburones de La Guaira players
Tidewater Tides players
Bochy, Bruce
Baseball players from San Francisco